Kayamkhani or Kaimkhani (also spelled kayam Khani and Kaim Khani) is a Muslim community of India who were notable for ruling the Fatehpur-Jhunjhunu region in Rajasthan from the 1300s to the 1700s.

History
They are said to be descended from Chauhan Rajputs who converted from Hinduism to Islam in the 14th century during the reign of Firuz Shah Tughlaq.
As also stated by the historian Dirk Kolff the Qaimkhani have Turkic origins.

They ruled between 1384 and 1731 with Fatehpur, Rajasthan as the capital,  kayamkhani rajputs ruled in Fatehpur, Jhunjhunu and Singhana.

See also
Islam

References

Rajput clans of Rajasthan
Rajput clans of Haryana
Muslim communities of Rajasthan